Dr. John J. Schumacher founded Southwestern University School of Law in 1911.  Schumacher intended the university to be an independent, nonprofit, nonsectarian institution.

Schumacher intended Southwestern to provide legal education opportunities for qualified students that might not otherwise have an opportunity to pursue such a degree.   For this reason, the university actively encouraged the enrollment of minorities and women.

Scholarship
The John J. Schumacher Minority Leadership scholarship program was created to provide up to full-tuition scholarships for entering minority students with exceptional academic and leadership potential.  EBC | Scholarship Directory Scholarship Directorypage1 | Santa Barbara Cal-SOAP Consortium Schumacher Scholarship recipients are selected on the basis of undergraduate performance (typically at least a B average) and extracurricular activities, work experience, evidence of leadership abilities, and LSAT score, as well as other factors.  Prospective students must apply with Southwestern’s Office of Admissions.

Eligible Recipients
Ethnicity: African American, Asian American, Chicano/Latino/Hispanic, Native American, Pacific Islander, Person of color

References 

Living people
Year of birth missing (living people)
Southwestern Law School
University and college founders